Górki (meaning "hills") may refer to the following places in Poland:

Greater Poland Voivodeship
Górki, Kalisz County in Greater Poland Voivodeship (west-central Poland)
Górki, Koło County in Greater Poland Voivodeship (west-central Poland)

Łódź Voivodeship
Górki, Pajęczno County in Łódź Voivodeship (central Poland)
Górki, Sieradz County in Łódź Voivodeship (central Poland)

Lublin Voivodeship
Górki, Gmina Karczmiska in Lublin Voivodeship (east Poland)
Górki, Parczew County in Lublin Voivodeship (east Poland)

Lubusz Voivodeship
Górki, Gorzów County in Lubusz Voivodeship (west Poland)
Górki, Strzelce-Drezdenko County in Lubusz Voivodeship (west Poland)

Masovian Voivodeship
Górki, Białobrzegi County in Masovian Voivodeship (east-central Poland)
Górki, Garwolin County in Masovian Voivodeship (east-central Poland)
Górki, Łosice County in Masovian Voivodeship (east-central Poland)
Górki, Mińsk County in Masovian Voivodeship (east-central Poland)
Górki, Nowy Dwór Mazowiecki County in Masovian Voivodeship (east-central Poland)
Górki, Otwock County in Masovian Voivodeship (east-central Poland)
Górki, Płock County in Masovian Voivodeship (east-central Poland)
Górki, Przasnysz County in Masovian Voivodeship (east-central Poland)
Górki, Siedlce County in Masovian Voivodeship (east-central Poland)
Górki, Sochaczew County in Masovian Voivodeship (east-central Poland)
Górki, Żyrardów County in Masovian Voivodeship (east-central Poland)

Pomeranian Voivodeship
Górki, Bytów County in Pomeranian Voivodeship (north Poland)
Górki, Gmina Stary Dzierzgoń in Pomeranian Voivodeship (north Poland)
Górki, Gmina Sztum in Pomeranian Voivodeship (north Poland)
Górki, Kościerzyna County in Pomeranian Voivodeship (north Poland)
Górki, Kwidzyn County in Pomeranian Voivodeship (north Poland)

Silesian Voivodeship
Górki, a district of the town of Lędziny, in Silesian Voivodeship
Górki, Kłobuck County in Silesian Voivodeship (south Poland)

Subcarpathian Voivodeship
Górki, Brzozów County in Subcarpathian Voivodeship (south-east Poland)
Górki, Mielec County in Subcarpathian Voivodeship (south-east Poland)

Świętokrzyskie Voivodeship
Górki, Busko County in Świętokrzyskie Voivodeship (south-central Poland)
Górki, Kielce County in Świętokrzyskie Voivodeship (south-central Poland)
Górki, Pińczów County in Świętokrzyskie Voivodeship (south-central Poland)
Górki, Sandomierz County in Świętokrzyskie Voivodeship (south-central Poland)
Górki, Skarżysko County in Świętokrzyskie Voivodeship (south-central Poland)

Warmian-Masurian Voivodeship
Górki, Kętrzyn County in Warmian-Masurian Voivodeship (north Poland)
Górki, Pisz County in Warmian-Masurian Voivodeship (north Poland)

West Pomeranian Voivodeship
Górki, Kamień County in West Pomeranian Voivodeship (north-west Poland)
Górki, Szczecinek County in West Pomeranian Voivodeship (north-west Poland)

Other voivodeships
Górki, Kuyavian-Pomeranian Voivodeship (north-central Poland)
Górki, Opole Voivodeship (south-west Poland)

See also
Gorki (disambiguation)
Gorky (disambiguation)
Górki Małe (disambiguation) (set index article)
Górki Wielkie